The status of Women in the Maldives was traditionally fairly high, as attested to in part by the existence of four Sultanas.

Dress rules
Although the majority of Maldivian today women wear the veil, this is a phenomenon experienced in the past two decades or so, possibly as a response to increased religious conservatism. 

There are no official laws in the Constitution of the Maldives that require women to cover their heads, but since the early 21st-century Maldivian women has commonly wore a hijab and niqab in public.

The Maldives became Muslim in the 12th-century but women did not veil: in 1337, the Muslim traveller Ibn Battuta expressed his dislike of the fact that the Muslim women of the Maldives did not veil  and only wore a skirt (called feyli) over the lower half of their bodies, and that he had no success in ordering them to cover up.  
With the exception of a failed attempt to force women to veil in the 17th-century, veiling continued to be uncommon in the Maldives until the 20th-century. 

From the 1980s onward the veiling started to become more common in the Maldives due to growing Islamic conservatism, and in the early 21st-century women and girls was put under a growing social pressure to veil, resulting in resulting in hijab and black robes becoming common public wear by 2006.
 
In 2007, the US Department of State's annual International Religious Freedom Report referenced one instance in which a female student was restricted from attending school for wearing a headscarf, despite civil servants wearing them at work without issue;  conversely, there are reports of women being pressured into covering themselves by close relatives; of unveiled women being harassed, and of school girls being pressured to veil by their teachers.

Women are not strictly secluded, but special sections are reserved for women in public places in some events. However, those women who refuse to wear a veil or decide to remove it face social stigma from both their families and members of the public.

Sexual rights
Polygamy in the Maldives is legal, but very rare. Prostitution in the Maldives is illegal. Homosexuality is illegal.

Women do not adopt their husbands' names after marriage but maintain their maiden names. Inheritance of property is through both males and females. With one of the highest divorce rates in the  world, women in general have enjoyed marriage and divorce rights throughout history. Both divorced men and women face no stigma, and historically women also have the right to initiate divorce.

Catcalling and sexual harassment are major problems in Maldives for Maldivian and foreign women alike. Women find that it is a daily part of their lives to be harassed in the streets. A total of 96% of women in the Maldives reported having been harassed in the streets at some point in their lives, with 60% facing harassment before turning 16 and 40% reporting being sexually harassed before they turned 10. Men of all ages find catcalling perfectly acceptable in especially Male' city. Little to no action is taken against people who harass women and the number of sexual assaults and rapes are increasing.

In 2013, a 15-year-old rape victim received a sentence of 100 lashes for fornication. The sentence was later overturned by the Maldivian High Court, following an international petition campaign led by Avaaz. A disproportionate number of women face public flogging for extra-marital sex compared to men: the majority of men accused of extra-marital sex are acquitted. (Maldivian law only enforces punishment to these actions only through admission. Even though the Maldives is a 100 percent Muslim country for nearly a thousand years, there is no record of stoning, or execution for murder unlike most other Islamic or Non-Islamic nations across the world.)

Education
The male female ratio of enrolment and completion of education to secondary school standards remains equivalent, with female students academically exceeding the results of male students in recent years. But on average they earn less than half the salaries of men in the workplace, possibly as a consequence of a higher male education levels a few decades ago. However, with the increased number of females who pursue higher education, which is set to overtake males this is likely to change in the near future. This change is also seen positively in the birth rate, which currently sees the Maldives on a negative birth rate, due to prolonged educational periods and change in social norms.

Politics
In today's society some women hold positions in government and business but they are heavily under-represented. As of 2016 women only accounted for three out of 14 government ministers, five out of 85 lawmakers and six out of more than 180 judges. However the vast majority of Civil Servants are female employees.

References

 
Maldives